West Ham South was a parliamentary constituency in the County Borough of West Ham, in what was then Essex but is now Greater London.  It returned one Member of Parliament (MP) to the House of Commons of the Parliament of the United Kingdom, elected by the first-past-the-post voting system.

Boundaries
1950–1974: The County Borough of West Ham wards of Beckton Road, Bemersyde, Canning Town and Grange, Custom House and Silvertown, Hudsons, Ordnance, Plaistow, and Tidal Basin.

History 
The constituency was created under the Redistribution of Seats Act 1885 for the 1885 general election, and abolished for the 1918 general election.

It was re-established for the 1950 general election, and abolished again for the February 1974 general election.

Members of Parliament

MPs 1885–1918

MPs 1950–1974

Election results

Elections in the 1880s

Elections in the 1890s

Elections in the 1900s

Elections in the 1910s

Elections in the 1950s

Elections in the 1960s

Elections in the 1970s

See also 
 West Ham North, 1918–1950

References

External links 

Parliamentary constituencies in London (historic)
Constituencies of the Parliament of the United Kingdom established in 1885
Constituencies of the Parliament of the United Kingdom disestablished in 1918
Constituencies of the Parliament of the United Kingdom established in 1950
Constituencies of the Parliament of the United Kingdom disestablished in 1974
Politics of the London Borough of Newham
West Ham